The Red Rider (German: Der rote Reiter) is a 1935 German drama film directed by Rolf Randolf and starring Iván Petrovich, Camilla Horn and Friedrich Ulmer. It is based on the 1922 novel of the same title by Franz Xaver Kappus which had previously been made into a 1923 silent film.

The film's sets were designed by the art director Wilhelm Depenau and Erich Zander.

Cast
 Iván Petrovich as Rittmeister Otto von Wellisch 
 Camilla Horn as Hasia Nowrowska 
 Friedrich Ulmer as Generaldirektor Livius 
 Marieluise Claudius as Etelka, seine Tochter 
 Veit Harlan as Andreas, sein Sohn 
 Kurt Vespermann as Leutnant Biegl 
 Oskar Sima as Schopf, ein Agent 
 Bruno Ziener as Heckeli 
 Dorothea Thiess as Mascha 
 Michael von Newlinsky
 Ernst Rotmund
 Hans Schneider
 Alfred Stein
 Arthur Reppert
 Karl Falkenberg

References

Bibliography 
 Noack, Frank. Veit Harlan: The Life and Work of a Nazi Filmmaker. University Press of Kentucky, 2016.

External links 
 

1935 films
1935 drama films
German drama films
Films of Nazi Germany
1930s German-language films
Films directed by Rolf Randolf
German black-and-white films
Remakes of German films
Sound film remakes of silent films
1930s German films